Little Pal may refer to:

 The Healer (1935 film), also known as Little Pal, an American film directed by Reginald Barker
 Little Pal (1915 film), a 1915 American silent drama film